Confusion of Feelings is a 1977 Soviet drama film directed by Pavel Arsenov.

Plot 
After graduating from school, Nadia entered the Leningrad Medical Institute, where she fell in love with a married man, and decided to return home, but at home not as calmly as she thought.

Cast 
 Elena Proklova as Nadya
 Sergei Nagorny as Volodya
 Iya Savvina as Nina Dmitriyevna
 Aleksandr Kalyagin as Viktor Semyonovich
 Nina Mager
 Arina Aleynikova as Teacher
 Tatyana Drubich as Masha
 Andrey Yaroslavtsev as Koshelev
 Veronika Izotova
 Nikolai Konstantinov

References

External links 
 

1977 films
1970s Russian-language films
Soviet drama films
1977 drama films
Soviet teen films